Lakeside College, established in 2006, is a co-educational, independent P-12 school located in Pakenham, Victoria, Australia, associated with the Lutheran Church of Australia. The founding principal was Peter Miller.

The college caters for 409 students from Foundation to Year 12.

History 
The school opened in February 2006 as a member of Lutheran Education Australia. It has grown since then to now be a full P to Year 12 school, with 10 students graduating from the first Year 12 class in 2011. The first dux of the college was Sam Controneo.

The College changed its name to "Lakeside College" in 2015.

Thomas Brennen commenced as the Principal of the College in 2016.

References

External links
Lakeside College Official site.

Secondary schools in Melbourne
Buildings and structures in the Shire of Cardinia
Educational institutions established in 2006
2006 establishments in Australia